Gori Ganga (Kumaoni: Gori Gād) is a river in the Munsiari tehsil of the Pithoragarh District, part of the state of Uttarakhand in northern India. Its principal source is the Milam Glacier, just northeast of  Nanda Devi along with the Glaciers of the Ralam River, and the Pyunshani and Uttari & Dakshini Balati Glaciers that lie on the western face of the Panchachuli Peaks.

Etymology
In the local language "gori" means white or fair. "Gad" and "ganga" both mean river.  The water of this river froths and contains white clay/sand, so it looks white most of the time.

Course
The alpine trans-humant village of Milam is located one kilometer below the snout of the glacier.  Here a left-bank stream called Gonka joins the Gori.  The valley provides the approach route for access to peaks such as Nanda Devi East, Hardeol, Trishuli, Panchchuli and Nanda Kot.

The Gori is also fed by glaciers and streams flowing from the eastern slopes of the east wall of the Nanda Devi Sanctuary, and those flowing west from the high peaks of Panchchuli, Rajramba, and Chaudhara, including the Ralam Gad and the Pyunsani Gadhera. The Kalabaland-Burfu Kalganga glacier system also flows into the Gori Ganga Valley from the east.

The principal rivers joining the main trunk Gori river are listed below  - 
 Panchu Gad - True Right Bank at Panchu / Ganghar
 Burfu Gad - True Left Bank at Burfu
 Lwa Gad  - True Right Bank below Martoli
 Poting Gad - True Right Bank at Bogdayar
 Ralam Gad - True Left Bank upstream of Ruspiabagad
 Jimia Gad - True Right Bank at Jimmighat
 Suring Gad - True Right Bank at Suring Gad / Ghat
 Madkani or Madkanya - True Left Bank at Madkot - This river originates from the Pyunshani and Balati Glaciers at the base of the Panchachuli Peaks
 Ghosi Gad - True Left Bank at Baram
 Rauntees - True Right Bank at Garjia. This is the only major rain fed stream joining the Gori River.

Goriganga joins the Kali River at Jauljibi.

References

Rivers of Uttarakhand
Geography of Pithoragarh district
Rivers of India